Protemnodon is an extinct genus of megafaunal macropodids that existed in Australia, Tasmania, and New Guinea in the Pliocene and Pleistocene. Members of this genus are also called giant kangaroos.

Taxonomy
Recent analysis of mtDNA extracted from fossils indicates that Protemnodon was closely related to Macropus. The species formerly known as Protemnodon bandharr and Protemnodon buloloensis have been moved to a new genus, Silvaroo, while the New Guinean species P. nombe has been moved to the new genus Nombe.

Description

Based on fossil evidence, Protemnodon is thought to have been physically similar to wallabies, but generally larger and more robust. Protemnodon nombe was the smallest in the genus, weighing about 45 kg; Protemnodon roechus was the largest in the genus, weighing around 170 kg.

Several species of Protemnodon survived up until around 50,000 years ago. P. tumbuna may have survived in the highlands of Papua New Guinea as recently as 12,000 years B.P.

References

Prehistoric macropods
Pliocene mammals of Australia
Pleistocene mammals of Australia
Pliocene marsupials
Pleistocene marsupials
Prehistoric marsupial genera
Taxa named by Richard Owen
Fossil taxa described in 1873